The following lists events that happened in 2005 in Iceland.

Incumbents
President – Ólafur Ragnar Grímsson 
Prime Minister – Halldór Ásgrímsson

Events

March
 March 15 - Japanese immigration officials state that they are going to deport Bobby Fischer back to the United States, instead of allowing him to move to Iceland.
 March 21 - Iceland's parliament, Alþingi, votes to grant fugitive U.S. chess champion Bobby Fischer Icelandic citizenship.
 March 24 - Bobby Fischer leaves Japan for Iceland via Copenhagen after 8 months in detention.

 
2000s in Iceland
Iceland
Iceland
Years of the 21st century in Iceland